Ryszard Kosiński (January 12, 1955 – August 18, 2010) was a Polish sprint canoer who competed in the mid-1970s. At the 1976 Summer Olympics in Montreal, he was eliminated in the semifinals of the C-1 500 m event.

References
Ryszard Kosiński's profile at Sports Reference.com
Ryszard Kosiński's obituary

1955 births
2010 deaths
Canoeists at the 1976 Summer Olympics
Olympic canoeists of Poland
Polish male canoeists
Sportspeople from Warsaw